The South China National Botanical Garden of the Chinese Academy of Sciences (formerly Institute of Agriculture and Forestry) is a large botanical garden in Tianhe District, Guangzhou, Guangdong province in southern China.

History 
The garden was founded in 1929 by botanist Chen Huanyong (Woon-young Chun). The garden focuses on research in ecology, systematic and evolutionary botany, plant resources, biotechnology, landscape and gardening. It covers 1155 hectares and contains 2400 plant species.

The garden is organized into several specialized collections containing:

Greenhouses 
Alpine & Arctic plants
Aquatic plants
Mediterranean plants
Tropical plants
Desert plants

Garden 
Magnolias
Palms
Gingers
Orchids
Medicinal Herbs
Relic plants
Bonsai
Landscaping Trees
Camellias
Bamboo
Rhododendron
Economical plants
Rare and Endangered plants

Transport
Botanical Garden station on Guangzhou Metro Line 6

External links
Official site (English)
 Herbarium @ Eflora

Research institutes of the Chinese Academy of Sciences
Botanical gardens in Guangdong
Tourist attractions in Guangzhou
Gardens in Guangdong
Education in Guangzhou